Khanskaya is a rural locality (a stanitsa) under the administrative jurisdiction of Maykop Republican Urban Okrug in the Republic of Adygea, Russia, located on the Belaya River  northwest of Maykop. The population as of 2020 is 11,679.

It was established in 1862.

References

Notes

Sources

Rural localities in Maykop Federal City